Wolfgang Weber (26 June 1939 – 7 February 2023) was a German engineer and politician. A member of the Christian Democratic Union, he served in the Landtag of Saxony from 1990 to 1994.

Weber died on 7 February 2023, at the age of 83.

References

1939 births
2023 deaths
Christian Democratic Union (East Germany) politicians
Christian Democratic Union of Germany politicians
Members of the Landtag of Saxony
20th-century German politicians
People from Wrocław
People from the Province of Silesia